is a former Japanese football player.

Playing career
Hashigaito was born in Nara on March 30, 1982. After graduating from high school, he joined J1 League club Gamba Osaka in 2000. However he could not play at all in the match until 2001. In 2002, he entered Osaka Gakuin University. After graduating from Osaka Gakuin University, he joined newly was promoted to J2 League club, Ehime FC in 2006. On June 2, he debuted as center back against Sagan Tosu. However he could only play this match. In 2007, he moved to Prefectural Leagues club Tonan Club (later Nara Club) based in his local. In 2008, he moved to Prefectural Leagues club FC Tiamo. In November 2008, he returned to Nara Club. The club was promoted to Regional Leagues from 2009. He played many matches until 2013. Although his opportunity to play decreased from 2014, the club was promoted to Japan Football League from 2015. He retired end of 2017 season.

Club statistics

References

External links

Profile at Nara Club

1982 births
Living people
Osaka Gakuin University alumni
Association football people from Nara Prefecture
Japanese footballers
J1 League players
J2 League players
Japan Football League players
Gamba Osaka players
Ehime FC players
Nara Club players
Association football defenders